The Leinster Senior Cup is an association football cup competition organized by the Leinster Football Association. It is currently contested by LFA affiliated League of Ireland clubs, Leinster Senior League Senior Division clubs and invited teams from the various LFA affiliated junior leagues. Before the introduction of the FAI Cup, it was considered the major cup competition for clubs in what is now the Republic of Ireland. It is also the oldest association football cup competition in the Republic of Ireland.

History

Early years
After the Leinster Football Association was founded in 1892 it began organizing its own cup competition. The Leinster Senior Cup was first played for in 1892–93. The inaugural final saw Leinster Nomads defeat Dublin University 2–1.  After the inaugural win by Nomads, Bohemians and Shelbourne monopolised the cup for the next twenty-four years. For most of this era Bohemians and Shelbourne were members of the Irish Football League.

Olympia's Leinster Double
After Leinster Nomads, Bohemians and Shelbourne, Olympia became the fourth team to win the Leinster Senior Cup. In 1917–18, with team that included Jack McCarthy and Fran Watters, Olympia won both the Leinster Junior Cup and Leinster Senior Cup. In doing so they also caused one of the biggest upsets in the history of Leinster football. After winning the Leinster Junior Cup, they qualified for the Leinster Senior Cup. After receiving a bye in the first round, Olympia beat St James's Gate in the semi-final. In the final they defeated Shelbourne 1–0 with a goal scored by Fran Watters. According to Peter Byrne this also resulted in a popular giant killing chat – "Remember Olympia once beat Shels". Olympia effectively ended the Bohemians/Shelbourne monopoly and in subsequent seasons the cup was won by Leinster Senior League clubs such as St James's Gate and Dublin United.

Non-League of Ireland successes
Following the introduction of the League of Ireland in 1921–22, League of Ireland clubs have dominated the competition. However non-League of Ireland clubs, mainly from the Leinster Senior League, have enjoyed some successes. Brideville in 1924–25, Distillery in 1941–42 and St Patrick's Athletic in 1947–48 were all winners. Brideville were losing finalists in 1923–24 as were Glasnevin in 1924–25, Grangegorman in 1946–47, Transport in 1947–48, St Patrick's Athletic in 1950–51 and Longford Town in 1954–55.
In the 1946–47 final Mick O'Flanagan scored six goals for Bohemians as they defeated Grangegorman 11–0. Home Farm were winners in 1964–65 after defeating Dundalk 2–1 in the final on 26 December 1964 at Dalymount Park. Home Farm, Distillery in 1941–42 and Wayside Celtic in 1998–99 are the only non-League of Ireland clubs to defeat a League of Ireland club in the final. In more recent times St Francis, Cherry Orchard and St. Patrick's C.Y.F.C. have also been finalists.

Decline and revival
The 2000–01 competition suffered with fixture rows and was eventually abandoned after the quarter-final draw was made due to the 2001 foot-and-mouth outbreak. The cup was not played again until 2010. The competition was played yearly until the Covid-19 pandemic halted sporting contests in 2020 in Ireland. The Leinster Senior cup returned for the 2023 season.

List of Leinster Senior Cup finals

Notes

Performance by club

References

Further reading
 

 
5
Association football competitions in Leinster